Alía is a municipality located in the province of Cáceres, Extremadura, Spain. According to the 2014 census, the municipality has a population of 936 inhabitants.

Javier Saviola's grandfathers are from Alía.

Villages
 Cíjara
 Puerto del Rey
 La Calera
 Pantano de Cijara

References

External links
 

Municipalities in the Province of Cáceres